Conn is an unincorporated community in Copiah County, Mississippi, United States.

A post office operated under the name Conn from 1897 to 1930.

Notes

External links
 Photo of Conn from 1997

Unincorporated communities in Copiah County, Mississippi
Unincorporated communities in Mississippi